Onychopoda are a specialised order of branchiopod crustaceans, belonging to the superorder Cladocera.

The order Onychopoda is "one of the most morphologically distinctive groups of cladocerans". They have only four pairs of legs, compared to five or six pairs in Ctenopoda and Anomopoda. Unusually among branchiopod crustaceans, Onychopoda share with Haplopoda the presence of segmented appendages, which are used for grasping prey.

Most species of Onychopoda live in the waters of the Ponto-Caspian basin (Caspian Sea, Aral Sea, Black Sea including Sea of Azov), in remnants of the ancient Paratethys ocean. Some other species live in fresh water or in the oceans, where they can be widespread.

There are three families, containing 10 genera and around 33 described species, most of which are endemic to the Ponto-Caspian basin:
Cercopagididae Mordukhai-Boltovskoi, 1968 – 2 genera (Cercopagis and Bythotrephes), 14 species; Black Sea & Caspian Sea
Podonidae Mordukhai-Boltovskoi, 1968 – 7 genera, 17 species; Pont-Caspian (Caspievadne, Cornigerius and Podonevadne) and marine (Evadne, Pleopis, Podon and Pseudevadne)
Polyphemidae Baird, 1845 – 1 genus (Polyphemus), 2 species; fresh water

The embryos are protected by a brood pouch, which also secretes nutrients to aid their development. This may be related to the colonisation of the oceans, since the only other marine cladoceran, Penilia avirostris, has a similar pouch as a result of convergent evolution.

See also

Bythotrephes longimanus
Cercopagis pengoi

References

External links 

 Podon sp. fact sheet - Guide to the marine zooplankton of south eastern Australia
 Evadne sp. fact sheet - Guide to the marine zooplankton of south eastern Australia

Branchiopoda
Arthropod orders